Unaiuba vitticollis is a species of beetle in the family Cerambycidae. It was described by Per Olof Christopher Aurivillius in 1920. It is native to Peru.

References

Clytini
Beetles described in 1920